Arthur Eustace Morgan (26 July 1886 – 3 February 1972) was the eighth Principal and Vice-Chancellor of McGill University.

Born in Bristol, England, he was the first Principal of University College Hull from 1926 to 1935. From 1935 to 1937, he was the Principal of McGill. Returning to England, he was the Assistant Secretary, Ministry of Labour and National Service from 1941 to 1945. From 1954 to 1963 he was warden at Toynbee Hall.

References

1886 births
1972 deaths
Academics from Bristol
Civil servants from Bristol
People associated with the University of Hull
Principals of McGill University
Civil servants in the Ministry of Labour